Belleterre is a ville in northwestern Quebec, Canada, in the MRC de Témiscamingue.

History

In 1930, prospector William Logan discovered gold near Mud Lake (now called Lake Guillet). This led to the establishment of the Belleterre Gold Mines Company in 1935, and the formation of the Belleterre community at nearby Sables Lake to house the miners and their families. In 1942, the place was incorporated as a town and at its peak had some 2000 residents. But by 1957, the mine was depleted and closed.

Demographics 

Population trend:
 Population in 2021: 285 (2016 to 2021 population change: -8.9%)
 Population in 2016: 313
 Population in 2011: 298
 Population in 2006: 350
 Population in 2001: 381
 Population in 1996: 395
 Population in 1991: 418

Mother tongue:
 English as first language: 9%
 French as first language: 89%
 English and French as first language: 0%
 Other as first language: 2%

See also
 List of cities in Quebec

References

Cities and towns in Quebec
Incorporated places in Abitibi-Témiscamingue
Témiscamingue Regional County Municipality